Klarwein is a surname. Notable people with the surname include: 

Franz Klarwein (1914–1991), German tenor
Jason Klarwein
Mati Klarwein (1932–2002), French painter
Michaela Klarwein (born 1943 or 1946), German actress
Ossip Klarwein (1893–1970), Polish-born German-Israeli architect